The 2004 Ibero-American Championships in Athletics (Spanish: XI Campeonato Iberoamericano de Atletismo) was the eleventh edition of the international athletics competition between Ibero-American nations which was held at the Estadio Iberoamericano in Huelva, Spain on 6–8 August 2004. A record high of 27 nations took part while the number of participating athletes (430) was the second highest in the competition's history after the 1992 edition. The programme featured 44 track and field events, 22 each for men and women, and 16 championship records were broken or equalled at the three-day competition.

The host stadium was built specifically for the championships and it was the first major event to be held there. An opening ceremony was held outside the stadium at La Rábida (the monastery where Christopher Columbus stayed and successfully proposed his voyage to the Indies, which led to the Discovery of the Americas). High participation was attributed to the competition's proximity to the 2004 Summer Olympics, which was held in Athens two weeks later. The legacy of the championships is found in the Meeting Iberoamericano de Atletismo, an annual track and field meeting which is held at the same stadium.

The host nation, Spain, topped the medal table with 16 gold medals and 38 medals overall. Cuba (typically strong at the meeting) came second with fourteen gold medals and 22 medals overall. Brazil came third, producing six event winners, but had the second highest medal haul with a total of 23 medallists. Spain sent the largest delegation, entering 90 athletes, while Brazil (63), Portugal (51) and Cuba (33) were the next most numerous teams. 

A number of medallists went on to have Olympic success. Joan Lino Martínez, winner in the men's long jump, took an Olympic bronze medal. Cuba's female throwers performed well in Athens: Yumileidi Cumbá and Osleidys Menéndez were crowned Olympic champions, while Yipsi Moreno and Yunaika Crawford both reached the podium in the hammer throw. Fernanda Ribeiro, a 1996 Olympic champion, won the women's 5000 metres in Huelva, but retired in the Olympic final due to injuries.

Medal summary

Men

Women

Medal table

Participation
Twenty-seven nations of the Asociación Iberoamericana de Atletismo sent delegations to the 2004 championships, marking a new record. This represented all the organisation's members but for Guinea-Bissau. A total of 430 athletes (443 including out of competition contestants) took part in the competition – the second highest number that it had attracted at that point, after the 1992 edition.

 (10)
 (23)
 (5)
 (60)
 (3)
 (28)
 (24)
 (3)
 (31)
 (7)
 (8)
 (2)
 (7)
 (3)
 (23)
 (2)
 (3)
 (2)
 (6)
 (7)
 (51)
 (13)
 (2)
 (89)
 (3)
 (7)
 (21)

References

Results
Official results (archived). RFEA. Retrieved on 2011-11-19.
XI Campeonato Iberoamericano de Atletismo. AthleCAC. Retrieved on 2011-11-19.

Ibero-American Championships in Athletics
Ibero-American
Ath
International athletics competitions hosted by Spain
August 2004 sports events in Europe